Weeks and Day was an American architectural firm founded in 1916 by architect Charles Peter Weeks (1870–1928) and engineer William Peyton Day (1886–1966).

Weeks was born in Copley, Ohio, educated in the atelier of Victor Laloux at the École des Beaux-Arts from 1892 to 1895, and briefly partnered with John Galen Howard. (Weeks is unrelated to the Canadian-American architect W. H. Weeks, also practicing in San Francisco in these years, and is also unrelated to William E. Weeks, architect in Southern California.)

Day had been in partnership with pioneering San Francisco reinforced concrete engineer John B. Leonard.  With Weeks as designer and Day as engineer, the firm specialized in theaters and cinemas, including several exuberant movie palaces and hotels in the San Francisco Bay Area, extending to Los Angeles and San Diego.

The firm was most active immediately before Weeks' death in 1928. Day continued the firm for 25 more years, closing the firm in 1953.

Architectural work 
 Loew's State Theatre, downtown Los Angeles, 1921
 Don Lee Cadillac Building, San Francisco, with architectural sculpture by Jo Mora, 1921
California State Office Building (now Jesse M. Unruh State Office Building) and the Library and Courts Building, and fountain court inbetween (1922-1928), which make up the NRHP-listed Capitol Extension District, 900 block of the Capitol Mall, Sacramento, California (Weeks & Day)
 Huntington Apartments, 1922, converted to Huntington Hotel in 1924, Nob Hill, San Francisco
 headquarters of the San Francisco Chronicle, 901 Mission Street, San Francisco, 1924
 Stanford Theatre, Palo Alto, California, 1925
 Mark Hopkins Hotel, San Francisco, 1925
 Brocklebank Apartments, Nob Hill, San Francisco, 1926
 Hotel Sainte Claire, San Jose, California, 1926
 Peninsula Theatre, Burlingame, California, 1926
 Schlage Lock "Old Office" and Plant 1, San Francisco, 1926
 California Theatre, San Jose, California, 1927
 Fox Oakland Theatre, Oakland, California, 1928
 Fox Theater, now Copley Symphony Hall, San Diego, California, 1928
 Sir Francis Drake Hotel, San Francisco, 1928
 Cathedral Apartments, Nob Hill, San Francisco, 1930
 I. Magnin Building, Oakland, California, 1931
Fox-Oakland Theater, 1807–1829 Telegraph Ave., Oakland, California (Weeks & Day), NRHP-listed
 Hotel Sainte Claire, 302 and 320 S. Market St., San Jose, California (Weeks & Day), NRHP-listed
 Don Lee Building, 1000 Van Ness Ave., San Francisco (Weeks and Day), NRHP-listed
 Baker and Hamilton, 601 Townsend St., San Francisco (Weeks, Charles Peter), NRHP-listed
 Administration Building, Treasure Island, built 1938, SE Corner of Avenue of the Palms and California Ave., Treasure Island, California (Day, William Peyton; Kelham, George William), NRHP-listed
 Hall of Transportation, Treasure Island, SE Side of California Ave. between Aves. D & F, Treasure Island, California (Day, William Peyton, Kelham, George William), NRHP-listed
 Palace of Fine and Decorative Arts, Treasure Island, SE Side of California Ave. between Avenue F and Avenue I, Treasure Island, California (Day, William Peyton; Kelham, George William), NRHP-listed

See also 
 :Category:Weeks and Day buildings

References

External links
Weeks and Day at Cinema Treasures
William Peyton Day at Internet Archive
List of SF buildings designed by Weeks and Day
William Peyton Day Papers
 1201 California Street, Nob Hill, San Francisco

Architecture firms of the United States
Design companies established in 1916
Design companies disestablished in 1953
Architecture in the San Francisco Bay Area
1916 establishments in California
1953 disestablishments in California